Tessaro is an Italian occupational surname meaning "weaver". Notable people with the surname include:

 Kathleen Tessaro (born 1965), American author
 Raphael Tessaro Schettino (born 1985), Brazilian footballer

Italian-language surnames
Occupational surnames